The rufous-and-white wren (Thryophilus rufalbus) is a small songbird of the wren family. It is a resident breeding species from southwesternmost Mexico to northern Colombia and northwestern Venezuela. It was formerly placed in the genus Thryothorus (Mann et al., 2006).

This large wren breeds in lowlands and foothills from sea level up to  altitude in dry forests or, in wetter areas, more open scrubby woodland. The female alone incubates the three or four greenish-blue eggs for about two weeks to hatching, and the young fledge in about the same length of time again.

It has chestnut brown upperparts with a darker crown, strong white supercilium, brown stripe through the eye and black streaking on the cheeks. The underparts are white, with black barring on the lower belly and brown flanks. The wings and tail are barred with black. Young birds have duller upperparts and buff-tinged underparts. The subspecies T. r. minlosi of the Andean foothills of Venezuela has a greyish tinge to the crown and underparts.

Pairs may duet, with the second bird responding with a purring .

The rufous-and-white wren forages actively in low vegetation or on the ground in pairs; it is a shy species more often heard than seen. It mainly eats insects, spiders and other invertebrates

References

Hilty, Steven L. (2003): Birds of Venezuela. Christopher Helm, London. 
Mann, Nigel I.; Barker, F. Keith; Graves, Jeff A.; Dingess-Mann, Kimberly A. & Slater, Peter J. B. (2006): Molecular data delineate four genera of "Thryothorus" wrens. Molecular Phylogenetics and Evolution 40: 750–759.  (HTML abstract)
Stiles, F. Gary & Skutch, Alexander Frank (1989): A guide to the birds of Costa Rica. Comistock, Ithaca. 

rufous-and-white wren
Birds of Central America
Birds of El Salvador
Birds of South America
rufous-and-white wren
Taxa named by Frédéric de Lafresnaye